The Little Maquoketa River is a  direct tributary of the upper Mississippi River. The Little Maquoketa River is largely confined to Dubuque County, Iowa, and enters the Mississippi in the rural areas north of Dubuque.

It may have previously flowed through the Couler Valley.

Fishing 
Little Maquoketa River is a put and grow stream for trout, including brown trout. Three inch fingerlings are stocked each year and they reach 9 to 10 inches the first year, 12 to 14 inches the second year and continue to grow from that point on. The river is considered one of the best smallmouth bass and trout fisheries in Iowa.

See also
List of rivers of Iowa
Bee Branch Creek – The river to the south
Cloie Branch – Tributary of the Little Maquoketa
Little Maquoketa River Mounds State Preserve

References

External links
Iowa Water
Environmental Protection Agency

Tributaries of the Mississippi River
Rivers of Iowa
Rivers of Dubuque County, Iowa